Prasanna GK is an Indian film editor, working in the Tamil film Industry. Former assistant of the ace film editor Mr Sreekar Prasad, Prasanna GK made his debut in Balaji Mohan’s Maari.

Career 

Prasanna GK did his under-graduation at the Madras Christian College, Chennai before doing his diploma in Editing and sound design at the LV Prasad film and TV Academy. Prasanna assisted film editors Leo John Paul and T.S Suresh before joining Mr Sreekar Prasad. Having worked on films like Arrambam, Finding Fanny, Yaan as an assistant to Mr.Sreekar Prasad went on to make his debut with Balaji Mohan’s Maari, then he continued to work on Selvaraghavan’s Nenjam Marapathillai and Mannavan Vanthanadi apart from Dhanush’s directorial debut Power Paandi.

Filmography

Film Editor

|}

Awards

References

External links 
 
 http://jolheji15.blogspot.com/2018/12/mera-life.html
 Power Paandiyile Pala Visayangal at Ananda Vikatan
 http://jolheji15.blogspot.com/2018/12/mera-life.html

1985 births
Living people
Film editors from Tamil Nadu
Tamil film editors
Artists from Chennai
Telugu film editors